Cycas platyphylla is a cycad in the genus Cycas, native to Queensland, Australia.

The stems are erect or decumbent, growing to 1.5 m tall but most often less than a metre. The leaves are pinnate, keeled, 60–100 cm long. New fronds are glaucous blue at first, becoming dark yellow-green, moderately glossy above. Megasporophylls are thickly covered in orange indumentum and the developing seeds have an intensely glaucous sarcotesta.

Habitat
This cycad has a main distribution in sparse Eucalyptus savanna on skeletal soils over outcrops of rhyolite or basalt west of the Atherton Tableland in north-east Queensland. This species is fire tolerant. It grows abundantly in cool habitat

Gallery

References
Cycad Pages: Cycas platyphylla
The IUCN Red List of Threatened Species: Cycas platyphylla

platyphylla
Flora of Queensland
Cycadophyta of Australia
Endemic flora of Australia
Endangered flora of Australia